Vitaly Walerjewicz Khomitsevich (born 18 November 1978) is a six Russian ice speedway world champion. 

Khomitsevich won the Individual Ice Speedway World Championship title in 2003 and the Team Ice Racing World Championship titles with Russia in 2003, 2004, 2005, 2007 and 2008. 

His younger brother is another multiple world champion Dmitry Khomitsevich.

References

1978 births
Living people
Russian speedway riders
Ice Speedway World Champions
People from Kamensk-Uralsky
Sportspeople from Sverdlovsk Oblast